The 2017–18 season is Grimsby Town's 140th season of existence and their second consecutive season in League Two. Along with competing in League Two, the club will also participate in the FA Cup, EFL Cup and EFL Trophy.

The season covers the period from 1 July 2017 to 30 June 2018.

Competitions

Friendlies
As of 2 June 2017, Grimsby Town have announced ten pre-season friendlies against Cleethorpes Town, Grimsby Borough, Stamford, Barnsley, Bideford, Tavistock, Boston United, Blackburn Rovers, Wigan Athletic and Winterton Rangers.

League Two

League table

Result summary

Results by matchday

Matches
On 21 June 2017, the league fixtures were announced.

FA Cup
On 16 October 2017, Grimsby Town were drawn away to Plymouth Argyle in the first round.

EFL Cup
On 16 June 2017, Grimsby Town were drawn at home to Derby County in the first round. Following the abandonment for the first round tie, the fixture was rescheduled for 22 August 2017.

EFL Trophy
On 12 July 2017, Grimsby Town were drawn against Doncaster Rovers, Scunthorpe United and Sunderland U23s in Northern Group H.

Squad overview

Transfers

Transfers in

Transfers out

Loans in

Loans out

References

Grimsby Town
Grimsby Town F.C. seasons